Allium hintoniorum is a plant species native to the State of Nuevo León in northeastern Mexico.

The specific epithet hintoniorum is grammatically in a plural form, as the plant is named in honor of British-born botanist George Boole Hinton (1882-1943), his son Jaime, and his grandson George.

References

haemanthoides
Onions
Flora of Nuevo León
Plants described in 1994